The Battle of Jeonju  was one of the first battles fought in Korea during the Japanese invasions of Korea (1592–1598).

Even though this was a rather minor battle compared to others during the Korean Campaign, it would be one of the very most important victories for the Korean forces over the Japanese situated on land. Korean commander Yi Gwang led his army, which ended up defeating the opposing commander, Kobayakawa Takakage, in which his division was driven back to Geumsan.

References
 The Samurai Sourcebook

1592 in Asia
1592 in Japan
Jeonju
Jeonju